Sebastiano Dho (16 May 1935 – 31 August 2021) was an Italian Roman Catholic bishop and prelate. He served as the Bishop of the Roman Catholic Diocese of Saluzzo, based in Saluzzo, from 1986 to 1993. He was then appointed Bishop of the Roman Catholic Diocese of Alba Pompeia from 3 July 1993, until his retirement on 28 June 2010.

Born in Frabosa Soprana in 1935, Dho was ordained a Catholic priest in 1958. He died at the Santa Teresa Institute in Mondovì, Piedmont on 31 August 2021 at the age of 86. He had been hospitalized at the Regina Montis Regalis hospital in Mondovì during the weeks prior to his death as his health deteriorated.

References

1935 births
2021 deaths
Bishops of Alba
Bishops of Saluzzo
Bishops in Piedmont
Italian Roman Catholic bishops
20th-century Italian Roman Catholic bishops
21st-century Italian Roman Catholic bishops
People from the Province of Cuneo
People from Saluzzo
People from Alba, Piedmont